Furness Vale railway station in Derbyshire, England, is  south east of Manchester Piccadilly on the Manchester to Buxton line and serves the village of Furness Vale. It has a level crossing at the end of the platform controlled by a signal box.

The station is on the Stockport, Disley and Whaley Bridge line, originally built by the London and North Western Railway to connect with the Cromford and High Peak Railway and extended to Buxton in 1863.

Facilities
The station is unmanned, has no permanent buildings other than basic shelters and has a ticket machine on the Manchester platform - tickets must be bought prior to travel or on the train if using cash only.  Service running information is offered via automatic announcements and timetable posters.  The platforms are linked by footbridge, but there is step-free access via the level crossing to both platforms.

Service

Southbound there is a half hourly service to Buxton. On Sunday, there is an hourly service in each direction.

References

Photo gallery

External links

Railway stations in Derbyshire
DfT Category F2 stations
Former London and North Western Railway stations
Railway stations in Great Britain opened in 1857
Northern franchise railway stations
1857 establishments in England
Whaley Bridge